Pigeon Lake is a lake in Central Ontario, Canada. It is one of a group of lakes called the Kawartha Lakes, which are the namesake of the city of Kawartha Lakes, and part of the Trent–Severn Waterway, thus in the Lake Ontario drainage basin. Pigeon Lake is 27 km long and up to 3 km wide.

Geography
The west side and southern end of the lake is in the city of Kawartha Lakes. The northern and eastern end of the lake is in the municipality of Trent Lakes, and a small portion of the centre-east of the lake is in the municipality of Selwyn; both municipalities are part of Peterborough County.

Communities
Communities along and near the lakeshore include Bobcaygeon at the northwest, and Omemee at the south.

Tri-lake water system
Pigeon Lake is part of a tri-lake water system consisting of Pigeon Lake, Buckhorn Lake, and Chemong Lake.

Nearby landmarks
The Gamiing Nature Centre operates on the west shore of Pigeon Lake from a 100-acre property with a natural shoreline, surrounded by wetlands, forests and meadows.

Natural history
The most common game fish in the lake are smallmouth bass, largemouth bass,  walleye, yellow perch, carp, muskellunge as well as a number of panfish. Commercial and recreational fishing has caused the introduction of zebra mussels, which change the ecosystem by filtering the water and making it clearer. Some fish, such as Walleye, dislike the clear water and have become less abundant.

Recreation
The tri-lake area, of which Pigeon Lake is a part, is host to several popular fishing tournaments throughout the open fishing season.

See also
List of lakes in Ontario

References

Lakes of Kawartha Lakes